The Port Huron and Northwestern Railway (PH&NW) is a defunct railroad which operated in the Thumb area of Michigan during the 1880s. The company was chartered by a group of Port Huron, Michigan businessmen on March 23, 1878, and opened its first line, Port Huron to Croswell, on May 12, 1879. The PH&NW's main line ran from Port Huron through Vassar to East Saginaw; this  stretch opened on February 21, 1882. In addition the PH&NW operated three branch lines: Sand Beach, which was a continuation of the original Croswell line and ran up the Lake Huron coast; Port Austin, which split from "Sand Beach" at Palms and went through Bad Axe before reaching the northern tip of the Thumb; and Almont, which ran due west from Port Huron.

The Sand Beach branch opened completely on September 13, 1880, the Port Austin on December 11, 1882, and the Almont on October 3, 1882. The entire system, including the main line, was  narrow gauge.

On April 1, 1889, the Flint and Pere Marquette Railroad bought the PH&NW, which then ceased to exist as a separate company.

Notes

References 

Railway companies established in 1878
Railway companies disestablished in 1889
Defunct Michigan railroads
Predecessors of the Pere Marquette Railway
Narrow gauge railroads in Michigan
3 ft gauge railways in the United States